The following is a list of retired National Hockey League (NHL) players who played their entire NHL career—in at least ten seasons—exclusively for one team. As of the end of the 2020–21 season, 120 players have accomplished this feat, of which the Montreal Canadiens have had the most, with 19.  Of players who have spent their career with one franchise, Alex Delvecchio of the Detroit Red Wings holds the record of the greatest number of seasons, with 24. Delvecchio beat out former Detroit Red Wings teammate Gordie Howe for the record in the 1979-80 season when Howe’s World Hockey Association team, the Hartford Whalers, became an NHL team, thus disqualifying Howe from this list, which indefinitely made Delvecchio the all time leader. Howe broke the old record in the 1966-67 NHL Season by beating out Dit Clapper of whom spent 20 seasons with the Boston Bruins. Howe went on to holding the previous record (before Delvecchio) for 13 seasons, extending the old record to 25 seasons until the events mentioned above.

List
Key

Counts by franchise

Potential future candidates

The following active players have played at least ten seasons exclusively for one team to date. Table updated .

See also
 List of one-club men in association football
 List of one-club men in rugby league
 List of Major League Baseball players who spent their entire career with one franchise
 List of NBA players who have spent their entire career with one franchise
 List of National Football League players who spent their entire career with one franchise

References

1 franchise
Hockey, NHL